CBS 7 may refer to one of the following television stations in the United States:

Current affiliates 
 KBSH-DT, Hays, Kansas
Semi-satellite of KWCH-DT in Wichita, Kansas
 KBNZ-LD, Bend, Oregon
 KBZK, Bozeman, Montana
Semi-satellite of KXLF-TV in Butte, Montana
 KHQA-TV, Hannibal, Missouri/Quincy, Illinois
 KIRO-TV, Seattle, Washington
 KOAM-TV, Pittsburg, Kansas/Joplin, Missouri
 KOSA-TV, Odessa/Midland, Texas
 KTNL-TV, Sitka, Alaska
 WBBJ-DT3, a digital channel of WBBJ-TV in Jackson, Tennessee
 WDBJ-TV, Roanoke/Lynchburg, Virginia
 WHIO-TV, Dayton, Ohio
 WSAW-TV, Wausau/Rhinelander, Wisconsin
 WSPA-TV, Spartanburg/Greenville/Anderson, South Carolina/Asheville, North Carolina
 WTRF-TV, Wheeling, West Virginia/Steubenville, Ohio
 WWNY-TV, Carthage/Watertown, New York

Formerly affiliated 
 KATV, Little Rock, Arkansas (1953 to 1955)
 KBNM (later KJCW), Sheridan, Wyoming (2002)
 KCCO-TV, Alexandria, Minnesota (1958 to 2017)
 KMGH-TV, Denver Colorado (1952 to 1995)
 KTBC (TV), Austin, Texas (1952 to 1995)
 WHDH (TV), Boston, Massachusetts (1982 to 1995)
 WNAC-TV (1948 to 1961 and again from 1972 to 1982)
 WTVW/WMAL-TV (now WJLA-TV), Washington, D.C. (1947 to 1948)
 XELD-TV, Harlingen / Weslaco / McAllen / Brownsville, Texas (licensed to Matamoros, Tamaulipas, Mexico; 1951 to 1953)